The Crooked Eye is a 20-minute drama film short adapted, directed and edited by D. C. Douglas.  It is based on the short story of the same name by Betty Malicoat. In 2009 the film won for Best Animated Short at the Red Rock Film Festival in Utah.

Synopsis
The Crooked Eye follows a quiet woman through her daily drudgery while persistent memories of a recently unraveled marriage dreamily connect the guilty moments that made her world so unreal and unreliable.

Cast
Linda Hunt ... Sharon's Narrator
Fay Masterson ... Sharon
 Katherine Boecher ... Rosemary
 D. C. Douglas ... Frank
 Joe Duer ... Roy
 Clement Blake ... Wayne
 Monnae Michaell ... Sharon's Supervisor
 Ari Barak ... Sharon's Doctor
 Robin Daléa ... Sharon's Tough Co-Worker
 Karen McClain ... Sharon's Loud Co-Worker

Awards
Won Grand Jury Prize at Red Rock Film Festival (2009)
Won Best Screenplay in a HD Short at HDFest (2009)
Won the STIFFY Award at Seattle True Independent Film Festival (2009)

Trivia
The movie was filmed entirely on green screen.  All the environments were animated in post.

References

External links

2009 films
2009 short films